Fiske Seminary, formerly the Urmia Seminary, was a Missionary girls' school founded by the American Presbyterian Mission in 1838, and located in Urmia, Qajar Iran (present day Iran). It was the first school for girls in Iran. The school is named after Fidelia Fisk, an American Congregationalist and one of missionary founders.

History

The school was founded by Fidelia Fisk and the American Presbyterian Mission (also known as the Presbyterian Mission Agency) under the name the Urmia Seminary in Urmia, West Azerbaijan Province, Qajar Iran. The school was modeled after the Mount Holyoke Seminary.

It became a boarding school in 1843. It taught reading, writing, English, arithmetic, natural history, singing, sewing and knitting. When Fidelia Fisk left the school in 1858, the school was renamed the Fiske Seminary. 

The school played a major pioneer role. In 1883, only one woman in Urmia was literate; but by 1885, 600 girls had learned to read and write at the school. 
However, similar to the other missionary girls's schools founded in 19th-century Iran, the school was not allowed to accept Muslims girls as students, but could only accept Christian, Zoroastrian or Jewish students until 1906.

See also 
 American Board of Commissioners for Foreign Missions
 Iran Bethel School

References

Further reading 
 Borjian, Maryam. “The History of English in Iran (1836–1979).” English in Post-Revolutionary Iran: From Indigenization to Internationalization, vol. 29, Multilingual Matters / Channel View Publications, 2013, pp. 40–62. JSTOR, https://doi.org/10.2307/j.ctt21kk1tj.7.

External links 

 

Girls' schools in Iran
1838 establishments in Asia
19th-century establishments in Iran
History of women in Iran
Urmia
Educational institutions established in 1838
Defunct schools in Iran